The Platino Award for Best Actor in a Miniseries or TV series (Spanish: Mejor Interpretación Masculina en Miniserie o Teleserie) is one of the Platino Awards, Ibero-America's film awards presented annually by the Entidad de Gestión de Derechos de los Productores Audiovisuales (EGEDA) and Federación Iberoamericana de Productores Cinematográficos y Audiovisuales (FIPCA). 

The category was first awarded in 2018 at the 5th Platino Awards with Argentine actor Julio Chávez being the first recipient of the award for his role as Abel Prat in El Maestro. No actor has received the award more than once while actors Diego Boneta, Álvaro Morte and Javier Cámara are the only actors to be nominated more than once in the category with two nominations each.

In the list below the winner of the award for each year is shown first, followed by the other nominees.

Winners and nominees

2010s

2020s

See also
 Latin American television awards

References

External links
Official site

Platino Awards